"Mos shko" is a song by Kosovo-Albanian singer and songwriter Dafina Zeqiri featuring Kosovo-Albanian singer Yll Limani released as a single on 27 December 2020 by Bzzz Entertainment and Moneyz.  "Mos shko" was written by Zeqiri and Albanian singer and songwriter Elinel, and produced by Albanian producer Rzon. An official music video was uploaded simultaneously with the single's release onto YouTube also being awarded the "Best Image In The Clip" at the 2021 Netët e Klipit Shqiptar gala.

Background and composition 

"Mos shko" was written by Albanian singer and songwriter Elinel alongside Zeqiri, who was also credited for the composition. Albanian producer Rzon handled the producing process of "Mos shko". In early December 2020, Zeqiri published a photo on her social media in which she teased her upcoming single featuring Kosovo-Albanian singer and songwriter Yll Limani by briefly elaborating on its creation in the studio; written in the photo, Zeqiri announced that the single would have the name "Mos shko". Musically, it is an Albanian language r&b-inspired electro-pop song, featuring both singers singing in a "passionate" tone. It lyrically discusses an unresolved relationship where two lovers are finding it hard to go their separate ways.

Music video 

Prior to the release, Zeqiri and Limani teased the accompanying music video for "Mos shko" with a preview posted to their respective Instagram accounts. The video was ultimately premiered simultaneously with the single's release to the official YouTube channel of Dafina Zeqiri on 27 December 2020 at 18:00 (CET) on YouTube. Additionally, it was awarded with the "Best Image In The Clip" at the 2021 Netët e Klipit Shqiptar gala in Ulcinj, Montenegro.

Personnel and credits 

Credits adapted from Tidal and YouTube.

Dafina Zeqiricomposing, songwriting, vocals
Yll Limanivocals
Andi Golavideo directing
Elinelcomposing, songwriting
Rzonproducing
Wondervideo production
Yllka Mustafavideo directing

Track listing 

Digital download
""3:27

Release history

References 

2020 singles
2020 songs
Albanian-language songs
Dafina Zeqiri songs
Electropop songs
Rhythm and blues songs
Songs written by Dafina Zeqiri
Song recordings produced by Rzon